Cookstown is an unincorporated community located within New Hanover Township in Burlington County, New Jersey, United States. Located near Fort Dix, the area is served as United States Postal Service ZIP Code 08511.

As of the 2000 United States Census, the population for ZIP Code Tabulation Area 08511 was 1,133.

Demographics

Notable people

People who were born in, residents of, or otherwise closely associated with Cookstown include:
 Edward Settle Godfrey (1843–1932), United States Army Brigadier General who received the Medal of Honor for leadership as a captain during the Indian Wars.

References

External links

Census 2000 Fact Sheet for Zip Code Tabulation Area 08511 from the United States Census Bureau

New Hanover Township, New Jersey
Unincorporated communities in Burlington County, New Jersey
Unincorporated communities in New Jersey